Fernando Vázquez de Arce (died 1520) was a Roman Catholic prelate who served as Bishop of Islas Canarias (1513–1520).

Biography
On 20 May 1513, Fernando Vázquez de Arce was appointed during the papacy of Pope Leo X as Bishop of Islas Canarias. He served as Bishop of Islas Canarias until his death in 1520.

References

External links and additional sources
 (for Chronology of Bishops)
 (for Chronology of Bishops)

15th-century Roman Catholic bishops in the Kingdom of Aragon
Bishops appointed by Pope Leo X
1520 deaths